Kinisi Triti is an album by the Greek singer Mando. It was released in Greece in 1991 by Minos. It is her third album and was released just a year after her previous effort.

Track listing
All lyrics by Evi Droutsa.  Music by Alexis Papadimitriou.
 "To Telio Zevgari"
 "Timorise Me"
 "Ti Zoi Mou Orizo"
 "Esy"
 "Anamnisis"
 "Apokliete"
 "Monomahia"
 "Ironia"
 "Apopse Simvenoun Polla"
 "Mazi Sou Horevo"

References

1991 albums
Greek-language albums
Mando (singer) albums
Minos EMI albums